Gisela Manderla (born 11 February 1958) is a German politician of the Christian Democratic Union (CDU) who served as a member of the Bundestag from the state of North Rhine-Westphalia from 2013 to 2017 and again from 2018 to 2021.

Political career 
Manderla became a member of the Bundestag in 2018. She was a member of the Committee on Foreign Affairs and the Defence Committee. She always contested the constituency of Cologne III.

She lost her seat at the 2021 federal election, as she was ranked 26 on the state list. Shortly before the election it became known that she employed the wife of a high-ranking armaments lobbyist in her Bundestag office.

References

External links 

 Bundestag biography 

1958 births
Living people
Members of the Bundestag for North Rhine-Westphalia
Female members of the Bundestag
21st-century German women politicians
Members of the Bundestag 2017–2021
Members of the Bundestag 2013–2017
Members of the Bundestag for the Christian Democratic Union of Germany